FC Olimpia-85 Bishkek is a Kyrgyzstani football club based in Bishkek, Kyrgyzstan that played in the top division in Kyrgyzstan, the Kyrgyzstan League.

History 
1985: Founded as FC Olimpia-85 Bishkek.

Achievements 
Kyrgyzstan League:
9th place, group B: 2003

Current squad

External links 
Career stats by KLISF

Football clubs in Kyrgyzstan
Football clubs in Bishkek
1985 establishments in the Kirghiz Soviet Socialist Republic